Dihydropteroate is an important intermediate in folate synthesis. It is a pterin created from para-aminobenzoic acid (PABA) by the enzyme dihydropteroate synthase. 

Bacteriostatic agents such as sulfonamides target dihydropteroate synthetase.  The effect of dihydropteroate synthetase inhibition is comparable to that of dihydrofolate reductase inhibition by trimethoprim, another bacteriostatic agent.  Combinations of these two drug types, such as the combination trimethoprim/sulfamethoxazole (TMP-SMX]), are commonly used to treat recurrent urinary tract, Shigella, Salmonella, and Pneumocystis jivoreci infections.

See also
 Dihydrofolic acid

References

Benzoic acids
Folates